Hurriyat is an urban-type settlement in Surxondaryo Region, Uzbekistan. It is part of Qumqoʻrgʻon District. The town population in 2004 was 4,000 people.

References

Populated places in Surxondaryo Region
Urban-type settlements in Uzbekistan